Kayyur–Cheemeni Grama Panchayat is a Gram Panchayat in Kasargod district of Kerala. The gram panchayat, which covers an area of 72.70 km2 and is located in the Neeleswaram block of Hosdurg taluk in Kasaragod district. This gram panchayat includes Kayyur, Cheemeni, Thimiri and Klayikode villages. There are 16 wards in this gram panchayat.

Boundaries
South - Pilikode Grama Panchayat, Kankol-Alappadamba Grama Panchayat and Karivellur-Peralam Grama Panchayat in Kannur district
North - Kinnaur-Karinthalam and West Eleri panchayats
East - West Eleri and Peringom Vayakara Panchayats in Kannur district
West - Neeleswaram and Cheruvathur panchayats

Statistics

Wards
Klayikkode
Muzhakkom
Kukkottu
Kayyur
Cheriyakkara
Podavur
Pallippara
Kundyam
Chanadukkam
Pattoli
Cheemeni
Challuvakode
Munda
Chembrakanam
Thimiri
Nalilamkandam

References

Geography of Kasaragod district
Gram panchayats in Kerala